Bryansky is a rural locality (a khutor) in Rossoshinskoye Rural Settlement, Uryupinsky District, Volgograd Oblast, Russia. The population was 92 as of 2010.

Geography 
Bryansky is located 35 km southwest of Uryupinsk (the district's administrative centre) by road. Rossoshinsky is the nearest rural locality.

References 

Rural localities in Uryupinsky District